Charles Dalton (June 9, 1850 – December 9, 1933) was a Canadian businessman, politician and philanthropist on Prince Edward Island.

Biography
Charles Dalton was born at Tignish, Prince Edward Island, the son of Patrick Dalton and Margaret McCarthy. He first worked as a farmer and then a druggist. He married Anne Gavin in 1874.

Dalton earned his fortune through silver fox breeding, in the process making the island the centre of the world's trade in the fur-bearing animal. He used his fortune to purchase The Guardian newspaper in Charlottetown. He served as a Conservative provincial cabinet minister and then the 13th Lieutenant Governor of Prince Edward Island from 1930 until his death in 1933.

During World War I, he donated a motor ambulance to the Canadian government. He also built a school in his home town of Tignish. In 1916, he was named a Knight Commander in the Order of St. Gregory the Great.

Dalton became devoted to the fight against tuberculosis after losing a daughter to the disease, donating funds to allow for the construction of a sanatorium on the island which was named in his honour.

References

Progressive Conservative Party of Prince Edward Island MLAs
Canadian newspaper publishers (people)
Lieutenant Governors of Prince Edward Island
Knights Commander of the Order of St Gregory the Great
1850 births
1933 deaths
Burials at Kensico Cemetery
People from Tignish, Prince Edward Island